Handforth Hall is a former manor house in Handforth, Cheshire, England.  It is dated 1562, and was built for Sir Urian Brereton.  Alterations have been made to it in the 17th century, and subsequently.  The hall is a timber-framed building and currently consists of a single range, with two storeys and five bays.  Originally it was either E-shaped or quadrilateral in plan.  The hall is recorded in the National Heritage List for England as a designated Grade II* listed building.  It was at one time the home of Sir William Brereton, a Parliamentary commander in the English Civil War.

Under a coved gable by the porch entrance there is an ornately carved inscription on the lintel, reading:

"THIS HAULLE WAS BUYLDED IN THE YEARE OF OUR LORD GOD MCCCCCLXll BY
URYAN BRERETON KNIGHT WHOM MARYED MARGARET DAUGHTER AND HEYRE OF
WYLLYAM HANDFORTH OF HANDFORTHE ESQUYER AND HAD ISSUE VI SONNES AND II DAUGHTERS."

See also

Grade II* listed buildings in Cheshire East
Listed buildings in Wilmslow

References

Further reading

External links

Houses completed in 1562
Country houses in Cheshire
Timber framed buildings in Cheshire
Grade II* listed buildings in Cheshire
Grade II* listed houses
1562 establishments in England